DocuSign, Inc. is an American company headquartered in San Francisco, California, that allows organizations to manage electronic agreements. As part of the DocuSign Agreement Cloud, DocuSign offers eSignature, a way to sign electronically on different devices. DocuSign has over 1 million customers and hundreds of millions of users in more than 180 countries.  Signatures processed by DocuSign are compliant with the US ESIGN Act and the European Union's eIDAS regulation, including EU Advanced and EU, Qualified Signatures.

In April 2018, DocuSign filed for an initial public offering. At the time of the IPO, the largest shareholders were venture investment firms Sigma Partners, Ignition Partners, Frazier Technology Ventures, and former CEO Keith Krach was the largest individual shareholder. None of the original founders are major shareholders. The company went public on the NASDAQ on April 27, 2018.

History
DocuSign was founded in 2003 by Court Lorenzini, Tom Gonser, and Eric Ranft. Tom Gonser came up with the idea when he was at NetUpdate, a company he founded in 1998, and where he served as CEO. Through its history, NetUpdate had acquired several companies, including an e-signature start-up in Seattle called DocuTouch that had been funded by Timberline Venture Partners, Bill Kallman and Jeff Tung with $4M. Timberline invested another $1 M in the merger into Netupdate. DocuTouch held patents on Web-based digital signatures and collaboration. With internal support from Gonser, Lorenzini negotiated the purchase of certain DocuTouch assets from NetUpdate and started DocuSign. Gonser then left the NetUpdate Board to focus on DocuSign full-time.

The firm began sales in 2005 when zipForm, now zipLogix, integrated DocuSign into its virtual real estate forms. Mock trials featuring licensed attorneys and real judges highlighted the admissibility of DocuSign contracts in court based on encrypted audit logs of signature events, as well as the impossibility of changing contracts.

In January 2007, Court Lorenzini stepped down as CEO and Chairman of the Board and took on the role of Executive Vice President of Business Development. He was replaced as CEO by Matthew Schiltz, who served in that role until January 2010. Steven King replaced Schultz as CEO and moved the corporate headquarters from Seattle to San Francisco. Keith Krach became DocuSign's chairman of the board in January 2010 and its CEO in August 2011.

In June 2010, DocuSign added support for iPhone, iPad and phone-based user authentication. DocuSign also began referring to its service as “eSignature Transaction Management”. By the end of 2010, the company handled 73 percent of the Saas-based electronic signature market with 80 million signatures processed. Scale Venture Partners led an investment round of $27 million in December 2010.

DocuSign opened an office in London, England, in September 2011.  In the same year, DocuSign opened an office in San Francisco that now functions as its global headquarters.

DocuSign signed an agreement with PayPal in April 2012 that allowed users to capture signatures and payments in a single transaction with DocuSign Payment.  Similar partnerships with Salesforce.com, and Google Drive preceded the PayPal agreement.

In July 2012, Business Insider reported that about 90% of Fortune 500 companies had signed up to use DocuSign.

On January 10, 2013, DocuSign and Equifax announced a partnership to simplify electronic delivery of the Requests for Transcript of Tax Return Form 4506-T to the United States Internal Revenue Service. Under the partnership, Equifax allows lenders to use DocuSign to securely send requests to loan applicants. DocuSign and Equifax were among 14 firms that participated in a nine-month feasibility study of electronic signatures for 4506-T forms in 2011.

In October 2015, Keith Krach announced he would step down as CEO once a search for a new CEO was completed . In 2016, DocuSign was ranked #3 on the Forbes Cloud 100 list.

In January 2017, veteran software executive Daniel Springer was named as the new CEO. Also in 2017, DocuSign was ranked #4 on the Forbes Cloud 100 list.

In July 2018, DocuSign acquired SpringCM for $220 million.

In March 2019, DocuSign announced the DocuSign Agreement Cloud, a suite of products and integrations for automating and connecting the entire agreement process digitally. This marked the company's transition from their former position in digital transaction management.

In February 2020, DocuSign acquired Seal Software for $188 million.

DocuSign ranked number 6 on Fast Company's Most Innovative Enterprise Tech Companies of 2022.

On June 21, 2022, DocuSign announced that Daniel Springer had agreed to step aside as Chief Executive Officer. Effective immediately, Chairman of the Board Mary Agnes "Maggie" Wilderotter was appointed interim CEO to help the senior executive team drive improved execution in all phases of the company's business.

DocuSign announced on September 22, 2022, that Allan Thygesen as its new CEO. Prior to his tenure, Thygesen was an executive at Google. Thygesen assumed office on October 10.

Funding 
In 2004, DocuSign raised $4.6 million in a Series A financing from Ignition Partners and Frazier Technology Ventures. In 2006, Sigma Partners led Series A1 and Series B financings, becoming the largest shareholder, a position it held at the time of the IPO, with returns over $700 million. Between 2006 and 2009 DocuSign raised $30 million that allowed the firm to add corporate clients and process 48 million signatures.

In July 2012, DocuSign raised $47.5 million in venture funding from investors including Kleiner Perkins Caufield & Byers; the round later grew closer to $56 million. In March 2014, the company announced it had raised $85 million in a new funding round.  Though unconfirmed, The Wall Street Journal reported the round was based on a company valuation of $1.6 billion.

In May 2015, the company announced it had raised $233 million in a new funding round, with some estimating a $3 billion company valuation.

In 2018, the company announced plans for an initial public offering on the NASDAQ, with the goal of raising up to $543 million when the company goes public. Neither the original founders nor current CEO Daniel Springer were major shareholders at that time. Former CEO Keith Krach was the largest individual shareholder at 5.5%, about 8.5 million shares at the time of the IPO. Venture capital firms Sigma Partners, Ignition Partners, and now-defunct company Frazier Technology Ventures were the largest shareholders.

Products and structure

DocuSign's services are offered either by subscription or free of charge as a mobile device app. Signatures and documents are uploaded, then encrypted and a unique hash created. If a signed document is later changed, the hash will not match the information stored by DocuSign if a document has been tampered with or compromised. By 2018, more than 20 billion pieces of paper and 608,000 barrels of oil had been saved by the company through avoidance of wasted printouts for signatures.

DocuSign Professional emails recipients an electronically signed document requesting review of a document after it is uploaded. Each party must agree to complete business electronically, review the document, and apply a signature. Signatures may be added from a stored copy of a signature or generated automatically by the software. Phone confirmation and background checks are offered as premium services.

DocuSign released its free-of-charge mobile app DocuSign Ink, later named DocuSign eSignature, for Apple iOS and Android operating systems in November 2011. DocuSign Ink allows users to sign and documents with a stored signature image, which may be created in graphic design software, captured from an image of a paper document or selected from a variety of prefabricated signatures based on the user's legal name.  The saved signature, and other information such as name and date, can be applied to PDF files, word processing documents and images. To complete a document, users apply their signatures and send completed documents to cloud storage for review.

DocuSign IMPACT Foundation 

On 15 March 2015, CEO Keith Krach announced the formation of the $30 million DocuSign IMPACT Foundation to give to charities and transform lives through DocuSign technology.

See also
 Adobe Sign
 Electronic signature
 Handwriting recognition
 Title 21 CFR Part 11
 Uniform Electronic Transactions Act
 PandaDoc
 HelloSign

References

External links

Business software companies
Electronic signature providers
Software companies based in the San Francisco Bay Area
Companies based in San Francisco
Companies listed on the Nasdaq
2003 establishments in California
Software companies established in 2003
2018 initial public offerings
Software companies of the United States
American companies established in 2003